Georgy Ivanovich Drozd (28 May 1941, Kyiv –  10 June 2015, Kyiv) was a Soviet and Ukrainian actor, member of the National Union of Cinematographers of Ukraine. People's Artist of Ukraine (1999).

Biography 
Born May 28, 1941 in Kyiv in the family working. He graduated from the Kyiv National I. K. Karpenko-Kary Theatre, Cinema and Television University.

He worked at the Lesya Ukrainka National Academic Theater of Russian Drama.

His son is actor Maxim Drozd.

Death
In 2013 the actor became seriously ill. On June 10, 2015, Georgy Drozd died after a long illness.

Selected filmography
Where were you, Odysseus? (1978)
Disintegration (1990)
Dark Waters (1994)
Cinderella (2002)
A Second Before... (2007)
House with Lilies (2014)

References

External links

1941 births
2015 deaths
Soviet male film actors
Soviet male stage actors
Ukrainian male film actors
Ukrainian male stage actors
Recipients of the title of People's Artists of Ukraine
Kyiv National I. K. Karpenko-Kary Theatre, Cinema and Television University alumni